Brad Pickett (born 24 September 1978) is an English former mixed martial artist. He is a former Cage Rage British Featherweight Champion. He competed as a bantamweight in the Ultimate Fighting Championship; Dana White  stated that Pickett was one of his favourite fighters to watch. He has also competed for World Extreme Cagefighting and BodogFIGHT, and at the Dynamite!! USA event.

Background
Pickett's fight entrance typically involved entering to the song "Wallop" by Chas & Dave, wearing a string vest, cut-off jeans and his customary trilby hat. He is a supporter of the London football club Tottenham Hotspur. Pickett played football and boxed growing up, before becoming interested in MMA.

Mixed martial arts career
Early in his career, Pickett fought mainly for the Cage Rage organisation; his first appearance was on 27 November 2004 with a win over Stuart Grant. He became the Cage Rage British Featherweight Champion on 10 September 2005 at Cage Rage 13 by defeating Ozzy Haluk via submission.
On 22 August, at Ultimate Challenge MMA: Payback (held in The Troxy, London), Pickett won his seventh successive mixed martial arts bout, against David Lee. The win came due to a guillotine choke in the first round.

World Extreme Cagefighting
On 30 October 2009, the Zuffa-owned WEC announced they had signed Pickett to a multi-fight deal. Pickett, fighting at bantamweight, made his WEC debut against Kyle Dietz on 19 December 2009 at WEC 45. He won the fight via submission in the second round, also winning Submission of the Night honours.

Pickett next faced WEC newcomer Demetrious Johnson on 24 April 2010 at WEC 48. In a competitive fight, both men exchanged takedowns and strikes throughout, though Pickett was more dominant on the ground, controlling the fight with well-timed takedowns and counter-strikes: Pickett won via unanimous decision (30–27, 30–27, 29–28).

Pickett's next bout was against WEC veteran Scott Jorgensen. Pickett had some success on his feet during the first two rounds, but was ultimately out-wrestled by the 3-time Pac-10 champion in the latter two rounds, losing to Jorgensen 30–27 on all the judges' scorecards.

Pickett then faced Ivan Menjivar on 16 December 2010 at WEC 53. Both fighters proved to be evenly matched; Pickett edged a unanimous decision 29–28.

Ultimate Fighting Championship

Bantamweight
In October 2010, World Extreme Cagefighting merged with the Ultimate Fighting Championship. As part of the merger, all WEC fighters were transferred to the UFC.

Pickett was expected to make his UFC debut against former WEC Bantamweight Champion Miguel Torres on 28 May 2011 at UFC 130.  However, Pickett was forced out of the bout with an injury and replaced by Demetrious Johnson.

Pickett faced Renan Barão on 5 November 2011 at UFC 138. Pickett was submitted in the first round via rear-naked choke. The bout earned Fight of the Night honours.

Pickett defeated Damacio Page by submission via rear-naked-choke in the second round of UFC on Fuel TV: Gustafsson vs. Silva. on 14 April 2012. The bout was awarded Fight of the Night.

Pickett next fought Yves Jabouin on 29 September 2012 at UFC on Fuel TV 5. He won the fight via first-round KO, earning Knockout of the Night honours in the process.

Pickett was defeated by Eddie Wineland via split decision on 29 December 2012 at UFC 155.

Pickett faced Mike Easton on 6 April 2013 at UFC on Fuel TV 9. He won the back-and-forth fight via split decision.  The win earned Pickett another Fight of the Night bonus.

Pickett faced Michael McDonald on 17 August 2013, at UFC Fight Night 26. Pickett lost the fight via submission (triangle choke) in the second round.  Despite the loss, Pickett was given a Fight of the Night bonus.

Flyweight
In late 2013, it was announced that Pickett would drop down to the Flyweight division for his next fight. He was expected to make his Flyweight debut against Ian McCall at UFC Fight Night 37 on 8 March 2014. However, on 13 February, it was announced that McCall had pulled out of the bout and was replaced by promotional newcomer Neil Seery. He won the fight via unanimous decision.

The rescheduled bout with McCall took place on 19 July 2014 at UFC Fight Night 46. Pickett lost the fight via unanimous decision.

Pickett faced Chico Camus on 22 November 2014 at UFC Fight Night 57. He lost the back-and-forth fight via split decision.

Return to Bantamweight
Pickett faced Thomas Almeida in a bantamweight bout on 11 July 2015 at UFC 189. He lost his third consecutive fight via KO in the second round.

Pickett was expected to face Henry Briones on 27 February 2016 at UFC Fight Night 84. However, Briones pulled out of the bout on January 22 and was replaced by Francisco Rivera. Pickett won the back-and-forth fight via split decision.  19 of 24 media outlets scored the bout in favour of Rivera.

The bout with Henry Briones was rescheduled and expected to take place on 3 September 2016 at UFC Fight Night 93. However, in early August, Briones was replaced  Iuri Alcântara, for undisclosed reasons. Subsequently, the pairing was rescheduled to take place a month later at UFC 204. Pickett lost the fight via submission in the first round.

Pickett faced Urijah Faber on 17 December 2016 at UFC on Fox 22. He lost via unanimous decision.

A rescheduled fight with Henry Briones was expected to take place on 18 March 2017. However, Briones pulled out a week before the event and was replaced by Marlon Vera. Due to the short notice and preparation for Vera, the bout was contested at a catch weight of 140 lbs. Pickett lost the fight via TKO in the third round. After the fight, Pickett confirmed his intention to retire from MMA competition.

Return from retirement
After a self-imposed 17-month hiatus, Pickett signed a multi-fight deal with Absolute Championship Berkut and was expected to fight in ACB's first event in London, ACB 91 against Jesse Brock. However, the event was cancelled and Pickett's status with the promotion moving forward is unknown.

Bare Knuckle Fighting
Brad Pickett signed with BKB, a bare knuckle fighting organisation in Great Britain, and was scheduled to make his debut in the sport and organisation on March 30, 2019. Pickett won his debut.

Championships and awards

Mixed martial arts
Ultimate Fighting Championship
Fight of the Night (Four times)
Knockout of the Night (One time)
World Extreme Cagefighting
Fight of the Night (One time)
Submission of the Night (One time)
Cage Rage Championships
Cage Rage British Featherweight Champion (One time)
One successful title defence
Ultimate Challenge MMA
UCMMA Featherweight Champion (One time)

Mixed martial arts record

|-
|Loss
|align=center|25–14
|Marlon Vera
|TKO (head kick and punches)
|UFC Fight Night: Manuwa vs. Anderson
|
|align=center|3
|align=center|3:50
|London, England
|
|-
|Loss
|align=center|25–13
|Urijah Faber
|Decision (unanimous)
|UFC on Fox: VanZant vs. Waterson
|
|align=center|3
|align=center|5:00
|Sacramento, California, United States
| 
|-
|Loss
|align=center|25–12
|Iuri Alcântara
| Submission (triangle choke)
|UFC 204
|
|align=center|1
|align=center|1:59 
|Manchester, England
|   
|-
|Win
|align=center|25–11
|Francisco Rivera
| Decision (split)
|UFC Fight Night: Silva vs. Bisping
|
|align=center|3
|align=center|5:00
|London, England
|
|-
|Loss
|align=center|24–11
|Thomas Almeida
|KO (knee)
|UFC 189 
|
|align=center|2
|align=center|0:29
|Las Vegas, Nevada, United States
|
|-
| Loss
| align=center| 24–10
| Chico Camus
| Decision (split)
| UFC Fight Night: Edgar vs. Swanson
| 
| align=center| 3
| align=center| 5:00
| Austin, Texas, United States
| 
|-
| Loss
| align=center| 24–9
| Ian McCall
| Decision (unanimous)
| UFC Fight Night: McGregor vs. Brandao
| 
| align=center| 3
| align=center| 5:00
| Dublin, Ireland
| 
|-
| Win
| align=center| 24–8
| Neil Seery
| Decision (unanimous)
| UFC Fight Night: Gustafsson vs. Manuwa
| 
| align=center| 3
| align=center| 5:00
| London, England
| 
|-
| Loss
| align=center| 23–8
| Michael McDonald
| Submission (triangle choke)
| UFC Fight Night: Shogun vs. Sonnen
| 
| align=center| 2
| align=center| 3:43
| Boston, Massachusetts, United States
| 
|-
| Win
| align=center| 23–7
| Mike Easton
| Decision (split)
| UFC on Fuel TV: Mousasi vs. Latifi
| 
| align=center| 3
| align=center| 5:00
| Stockholm, Sweden
| 
|-
| Loss
| align=center| 22–7
| Eddie Wineland
| Decision (split)
| UFC 155
| 
| align=center| 3
| align=center| 5:00
| Las Vegas, Nevada, United States
| 
|-
| Win
| align=center| 22–6
| Yves Jabouin
| KO (punch)
| UFC on Fuel TV: Struve vs. Miocic
| 
| align=center| 1
| align=center| 3:40
| Nottingham, England
| 
|-
| Win 
| align=center| 21–6
| Damacio Page
| Submission (rear-naked choke)
| UFC on Fuel TV: Gustafsson vs. Silva
| 
| align=center| 2
| align=center| 4:05
| Stockholm, Sweden
| 
|-
| Loss
| align=center| 20–6
| Renan Barão
| Submission (rear-naked choke)
| UFC 138
| 
| align=center| 1
| align=center| 4:09
| Birmingham, England
| 
|-
| Win
| align=center| 20–5
| Ivan Menjivar
| Decision (unanimous)
| WEC 53
| 
| align=center| 3
| align=center| 5:00
| Glendale, Arizona, United States
| 
|-
| Loss
| align=center| 19–5
| Scott Jorgensen
| Decision (unanimous)
| WEC 50
| 
| align=center| 3
| align=center| 5:00
| Las Vegas, Nevada, United States
| 
|-
| Win
| align=center| 19–4
| Demetrious Johnson
| Decision (unanimous)
| WEC 48
| 
| align=center| 3
| align=center| 5:00
| Sacramento, California, United States
| 
|-
| Win
| align=center| 18–4
| Kyle Dietz
| Submission (Peruvian necktie)
| WEC 45
| 
| align=center| 2
| align=center| 4:36
| Las Vegas, Nevada, United States
| 
|-
| Win
| align=center| 17–4
| David Lee
| Submission (guillotine choke)
| UCMMA 6: Payback
| 
| align=center| 1
| align=center| 2:26
| London, England
| 
|-
| Win
| align=center| 16–4
| Dino Gambatesa
| Submission (guillotine choke)
| UCMMA 3: Unstoppable
| 
| align=center| 2
| align=center| 0:15
| London, England
| 
|-
| Win
| align=center| 15–4
| Antanas Jazbutis
| TKO (punch to the body)
| Cage Rage 28
| 
| align=center| 3
| align=center| N/A
| London, England
| 
|-
| Win
| align=center| 14–4
| Cristian Binda
| Submission (guillotine choke)
| Cage Rage 27
| 
| align=center| 2
| align=center| 2:52
| London, England
| 
|-
| Win
| align=center| 13–4
| Paul Reed
| Decision (majority)
| Cage Rage 26
| 
| align=center| 3
| align=center| 5:00
| Birmingham, England
| 
|-
| Win
| align=center| 12–4
| Frederic Fernandez
| Submission (guillotine choke)
| FX3: Fight Night 7
| 
| align=center| 1
| align=center| N/A
| Reading, England
| 
|-
| Win
| align=center| 11–4
| Vaughan Lee
| TKO (punches)
| Cage Rage Contenders 6
| 
| align=center| 3
| align=center| 3:20
| London, England
| 
|-
| Loss
| align=center| 10–4
| Hideo Tokoro
| Submission (armbar)
| Dynamite!! USA
| 
| align=center| 1
| align=center| 2:41
| Los Angeles, California, United States
| 
|-
| Loss
| align=center| 10–3
| Alex Owen
| Decision (majority)
| Cage Rage 21
| 
| align=center| 3
| align=center| 5:00
| London, England
| 
|-
| Win
| align=center| 10–2
| Gilbert Sims
| TKO (punches)
| Bodog Fight: Costa Rica Combat
| 
| align=center| 2
| align=center| 3:12
| San José, Costa Rica
| 
|-
| Win
| align=center| 9–2
| Phil Raeburn
| Submission (armbar)
| HOP 7: Cage Fever
| 
| align=center| 1
| align=center| 3:20
| Swansea, Wales
| 
|-
| Win
| align=center| 8–2
| Bret Lee
| Submission (armbar)
| Intense Fighting: Caged
| 
| align=center| 1
| align=center| 1:18
| Peterborough, England
| 
|-
| Win
| align=center| 7–2
| John Trent
| Submission (armbar)
| Absolute Fighting Championships 19
| 
| align=center| 1
| align=center| 3:58
| Boca Raton, Florida, United States
| 
|-
| Loss
| align=center| 6–2
| Robbie Olivier
| Submission (rear-naked choke)
| Cage Rage 18
| 
| align=center| 3
| align=center| 3:03
| London, England
| 
|-
| Win
| align=center| 6–1
| Hiroyuki Abe
| Decision (unanimous)
| Cage Rage 16
| 
| align=center| 3
| align=center| 5:00
| London, England
| 
|-
| Win
| align=center| 5–1
| Robbie Olivier
| Decision (majority)
| Cage Rage 15
| 
| align=center| 3
| align=center| 5:00
| London, England
| 
|-
| Win
| align=center| 4–1
| Ozzy Haluk
| TKO (stomp)
| Cage Rage 13
| 
| align=center| 2
| align=center| 4:25
| London, England
|  
|-
| Win
| align=center| 3–1
| Jordan Miller
| Submission (armbar)
| Cage Rage 12
| 
| align=center| 2
| align=center| 2:32
| London, England
| 
|-
| Win
| align=center| 2–1
| Aaron Blackwell
| TKO (corner stoppage)
| Cage Rage 11
| 
| align=center| 2
| align=center| 5:00
| London, England
| 
|-
| Loss
| align=center| 1–1
| Chris Freeborn
| TKO (punches)
| Cage Rage 10
| 
| align=center| 2
| align=center| 3:20
| London, England
| 
|-
| Win
| align=center| 1–0
| Stuart Grant
| TKO (punches)
| Cage Rage 9
| 
| align=center| 1
| align=center| 0:17
| London, England
|

Bare knuckle record

|- 
|Win
|align=center|1–0
|Mark Handley
|TKO (punch)
|Bare Knuckle Boxing 16
|
|align=center|1
|align=center|0:20
|London, England
|
|-

See also
 List of male mixed martial artists

References

External links
Official UFC Profile

Cage Rage report
Official site of Brad "One Punch" Pickett

1978 births
English male mixed martial artists
Bantamweight mixed martial artists
Featherweight mixed martial artists
Mixed martial artists utilizing boxing
Mixed martial artists utilizing Brazilian jiu-jitsu
Living people
Flyweight mixed martial artists
Sportspeople from London
English practitioners of Brazilian jiu-jitsu
Ultimate Fighting Championship male fighters